We, the Citizens! (Portuguese: Nós, Cidadãos!) is a Portuguese political party founded by members of the Portuguese Institute of Democracy (Instituto Democracia Portuguesa, IDP) after the large protest against the introduction of a single social tax in 2012.

History 
IDP is a civic association founded in 2007 and advocating the need for a more democratic society, respecting the sovereignty of the people and the rule of law. Nós, Cidadãos! claims to be "Classical Social Democrats", and campaign on government and judicial reform, participatory democracy, sustainability and social justice. The party strongly supports European integration. It is supported by several prominent judges and legal scholars as well as the famous Portuguese singer and composer José Cid.

In the legislative elections of 2015, they received 21,382 votes, ranked 12th, and did not elect any member of parliament. One quirk of their performance, however, was their second place in the "Outside Europe" constituency, behind the Portugal à Frente coalition. They even came top among registered voters in China. The Constitutional Court rejected a petition by the Socialist Party, who came third, to contest the election on the grounds of alleged electoral fraud.

Electoral results

Assembly of the Republic

European Parliament

Municipalities

Parishes

References

External links

2015 establishments in Portugal
Political parties established in 2015
Centrist parties in Portugal
Liberal parties in Portugal
Political parties in Portugal
Pro-European political parties in Portugal
Social liberal parties